Taj Mahal Hotel is a heritage hotel located in Hyderabad, India. It is located at Abids suburb. It is popular for its Udupi cuisine dishes.

History 
The Abids branch was established in the 1948 by two friends Anand Rao and Babu Rao along with Babu Rao's brother Sundar Rao.

Restaurant 
The restaurant serves vegetarian Udupi cuisine dishes.

Building 
The building was declared a heritage structure by the HMDA.

References

Hyderabad State
Heritage structures in Hyderabad, India
Heritage hotels in India